Reginald L. Knowles (1879 – 1950) was a book designer and illustrator who worked with his brother, Horace Knowles, on a number of exquisite illustrated books in the first two decades of the twentieth century, including Legends from Fairy Land (1907), Norse Fairy Tales (1910) and Old World Love-Stories (1913).

While both brothers usually share equal credit, it is understood that most of the colour illustrations and detailed monotone images were prepared by Reginald Knowles who signed "RLK" (i.e. : Everyman's Library).

The work of the Knowles' brothers drew influences from Art Nouveau, Victorian Fantasy and Gothic Revival imagery.

A decade after their earliest work, Horace Knowles produced a stunning and comprehensive suite of colour and monotone illustrations for Peeps into Fairyland (1924).

In later life Reginald illustrated the angling books of Wilfred Gavin Brown: "My River and Some Other Waters" (1947); Angler's Almanac: Some Leaves On A River (1949).

He also illustrated the inside cover and title page of the 1933 memorial edition of The Book of Simple Delights by Walter Raymond.

Works 
Legends From Fairy Land

Norse Fairy Tales

Old World Love-Stories

My River and Some Other Waters

Angler's Almanac: Some Leaves On A River

References

External links

There is an article & full bibliography by Martin Steenson in Studies in Illustration no.73 published by the Imaginative Book Illustration Society www.bookillustration.org

English illustrators
1879 births
1950 deaths
Book designers
Art Nouveau designers
Art Nouveau illustrators
English designers